The Landeryd Ladies Masters was a women's professional golf tournament on the Swedish Golf Tour, played between 2008 and 2010. It was held near Linköping, Sweden.

Winners

References

Swedish Golf Tour (women) events
Golf tournaments in Sweden